David Michael Bright (November 3, 1937 – September 22, 2017) was an American volleyball player who competed in the 1964 Summer Olympics and the 1968 Summer Olympics. He was born in Grants Pass, Oregon.

References

1937 births
2017 deaths
American men's volleyball players
Olympic volleyball players of the United States
Volleyball players at the 1964 Summer Olympics
Volleyball players at the 1968 Summer Olympics
Volleyball players at the 1963 Pan American Games
Pan American Games silver medalists for the United States
Pan American Games medalists in volleyball
Medalists at the 1963 Pan American Games
Sportspeople from Grants Pass, Oregon